Following is a list of Bangladeshi painters (in alphabetical order).



A
Zainul Abedin
Kafil Ahmed
Safiuddin Ahmed
Shahabuddin Ahmed

B
Murtoza Bashir
Shishir Bhattacharjee

C
Kanak Chanpa Chakma
Rashid Choudhury
Qayyum Chowdhury

D
Manishi Dey
Mukul Dey

H
Quamrul Hassan

I
Syful Islam

J
Syed Jahangir
Dilara Begum Jolly

K
Mohammad Kibria
Nitun Kundu
Hashem Khan

M
Firoz Mahmud
Mustafa Manwar

N
Rafiqun Nabi
Najib Tareque

P
Mustapha Khalid Palash

S
Abdus Shakoor
SM Sultan

See also

 List of Bangladeshi people

References

Painters
Bangladeshi